In Greek mythology, Iasus (Ancient Greek: Ἴασος) or Iasius (Ἰάσιος) was the name of several people:

Iasus (Iasius), one of the Dactyli or Curetes.
Iasus, king of Argos.
Iasus, son of Io
Iasius (Iasion), son of Eleuther and brother of Pierus. He was the father of Chaeresilaus and Astreis.
Iasius, another name of Iasion.
Iasus (Iasius), the Arcadian father of Atalanta by Clymene, daughter of Minyas; he was the son of King Lycurgus of Arcadia by either Eurynome or Cleophyle. His brothers were Ancaeus, Epochus and Amphidamas.
Iasus, father of Nepeia, who married King Olympus and gave her name to the plain of Nepeia near Cyzicus.
Iasius, winner of the horse-racing contest at the Olympic games held by Heracles.
Iasus (Iasius), king of Orchomenus and son of Persephone, daughter of Minyas. He was the father of Amphion, father of Chloris, wife of Neleus and Phylomache, wife of Pelias.
Iasus, father of Phaedimus. His son was killed by Amyntas in the war of the Seven against Thebes.
 Iasus, son of Sphelus (himself son of Bucolus), leader of the Athenians, was killed by Aeneas in the Trojan War.
Iasus, king of Cyprus, father of Dmetor. In the Odyssey, he appears in a story told (and made up) by Odysseus.
Iasus, father of Palinurus and Iapis.

Notes

References 

 Apollodorus, The Library with an English Translation by Sir James George Frazer, F.B.A., F.R.S. in 2 Volumes, Cambridge, MA, Harvard University Press; London, William Heinemann Ltd. 1921. . Online version at the Perseus Digital Library. Greek text available from the same website.
Callimachus, Callimachus and Lycophron with an English translation by A. W. Mair ; Aratus, with an English translation by G. R. Mair, London: W. Heinemann, New York: G. P. Putnam 1921. Internet Archive
 Callimachus, Works. A.W. Mair. London: William Heinemann; New York: G.P. Putnam's Sons. 1921. Greek text available at the Perseus Digital Library.
 Gaius Julius Hyginus, Fabulae from The Myths of Hyginus translated and edited by Mary Grant. University of Kansas Publications in Humanistic Studies. Online version at the Topos Text Project.
 Hesiod, Catalogue of Women from Homeric Hymns, Epic Cycle, Homerica translated by Evelyn-White, H G. Loeb Classical Library Volume 57. London: William Heinemann, 1914. Online version at theio.com
 Homer, The Iliad with an English Translation by A.T. Murray, Ph.D. in two volumes. Cambridge, MA., Harvard University Press; London, William Heinemann, Ltd. 1924. . Online version at the Perseus Digital Library.
 Homer, Homeri Opera in five volumes. Oxford, Oxford University Press. 1920. . Greek text available at the Perseus Digital Library.
 Homer, The Odyssey with an English Translation by A.T. Murray, PH.D. in two volumes. Cambridge, MA., Harvard University Press; London, William Heinemann, Ltd. 1919. . Online version at the Perseus Digital Library. Greek text available from the same website.
 Pausanias, Description of Greece with an English Translation by W.H.S. Jones, Litt.D., and H.A. Ormerod, M.A., in 4 Volumes. Cambridge, MA, Harvard University Press; London, William Heinemann Ltd. 1918. . Online version at the Perseus Digital Library
 Pausanias, Graeciae Descriptio. 3 vols. Leipzig, Teubner. 1903.  Greek text available at the Perseus Digital Library.
 Publius Papinius Statius, The Thebaid translated by John Henry Mozley. Loeb Classical Library Volumes. Cambridge, MA, Harvard University Press; London, William Heinemann Ltd. 1928. Online version at the Topos Text Project.
 Publius Papinius Statius, The Thebaid. Vol I-II. John Henry Mozley. London: William Heinemann; New York: G.P. Putnam's Sons. 1928. Latin text available at the Perseus Digital Library.
 Publius Vergilius Maro, Aeneid. Theodore C. Williams. trans. Boston. Houghton Mifflin Co. 1910. Online version at the Perseus Digital Library.
 Publius Vergilius Maro, Bucolics, Aeneid, and Georgics. J. B. Greenough. Boston. Ginn & Co. 1900. Latin text available at the Perseus Digital Library.

  
 Fowler, R. L. (2000), Early Greek Mythography: Volume 1: Text and Introduction, Oxford University Press, 2000. .
Smith, William. Dictionary of Greek and Roman Biography and Mythology, v. 2, page 556

Kings in Greek mythology
Princes in Greek mythology
Achaeans (Homer)
Kings of Minyan Orchomenus
Minyan characters in Greek mythology
it:Iaso